The Goldstone Deep Space Communications Complex (GDSCC), commonly called the Goldstone Observatory, is a satellite ground station located in Fort Irwin in the U.S. state of California. Operated by NASA's  Jet Propulsion Laboratory (JPL), its main purpose is to track and communicate with interplanetary space missions.  It is named after Goldstone, California, a nearby gold-mining ghost town.

The station is one of three satellite communication stations in the NASA Space Communications and Navigation (SCaN) program’s Deep Space Network (DSN), whose mission is to provide the vital two-way communications link that tracks and controls interplanetary spacecraft and receives the images and scientific information they collect.  The others are the Madrid Deep Space Communications Complex in Spain and the Canberra Deep Space Communication Complex in Australia.  These three stations are located at separations of approximately 120° longitude so that as the Earth rotates a spacecraft will always be in sight of at least one station.

The complex includes the Pioneer Deep Space Station (aka DSS 11), which is a U.S. National Historic Landmark.

Antennas
Five large parabolic (dish) antennas are located at the Goldstone site to handle the workload, since at any given time the DSN is responsible for maintaining communication with up to 30 spacecraft.  The antennas function similarly to a home satellite dish.  However, since the spacecraft they communicate with are much further away than the communication satellites which home satellite dishes use, the signals received are much weaker, requiring a larger aperture antenna to gather enough radio energy to make them intelligible.  The largest, a 70-meter (230 ft) Cassegrain antenna, is used for communication with space missions to the outer planets, such as the Voyager spacecraft, which, at 21.5 billion kilometers, is the most distant manmade object from Earth.  The radio frequencies used for spacecraft communication are in the microwave part of the radio spectrum; S band (2.29–2.30 GHz), X band (8.40–8.50 GHz) and Ka band (31.8–32.3 GHz).  In addition to receiving radio signals from the spacecraft (downlink signals), the antennas also transmit commands to the spacecraft (uplink signals) with high power radio transmitters (80kW) powered by klystron tubes.

A major goal in the design of the station is to reduce interference with the weak incoming downlink radio signals by natural and manmade radio noise. The remote Mojave Desert location was chosen because it is far from manmade sources of radio noise such as motor vehicles. The RF front ends of the radio receivers at the dishes use ruby masers, consisting of a bar of synthetic ruby cooled by liquid helium to 4.5 K to minimize the noise introduced by the electronics.

When not needed for spacecraft communication, the Goldstone antennas are used as sensitive radio telescopes for astronomical research, such as mapping quasars and other celestial radio sources; radar mapping planets, the Moon, comets and asteroids; spotting comets and asteroids with the potential to strike Earth; and the search for ultra-high energy neutrino interactions in the Moon by using large-aperture radio antennas.

History
The Goldstone complex was created in 1958 by the JPL to support the Pioneer program of deep space exploration probes.  Its location was determined by two criteria: a bowl-shaped environment was needed, and it needed to be distant from terrestrial sources of radio interference.  This site, on the grounds of Fort Irwin in the Mojave Desert, was found to meet the criteria.  Construction of the first radio telescope, DSS 11 or the Pioneer Deep Space Station, was begun by the United States Army and taken over by NASA after its creation.  It is a  parabolic Cassegrain antenna capable of receiving signals in the 1 to 3 GHz range.  It was taken out of service in 1981, having been technologically bypassed by later telescopes.  It was recognized as a National Historic Landmark in 1985 for its pioneering role in deep space exploration.

"Goldstone has the bird"
It is commonly believed that the first American satellite, Explorer 1, was confirmed to be in orbit by the use of the phrase "Goldstone has the bird". However, Goldstone was not in operation at the time of Explorer 1, and like many oft-repeated quotations it is incorrect. Others claim that the actual phrase was "Gold has it!", incorrectly identifying "Gold" as a temporary tracking station at Earthquake Valley, east of Julian, California. In fact, Gold Station was located at the Air Force Missile Test Center (AFMTC) in Florida and the temporary tracking station at Earthquake Valley was Red Station. Probably this detection of the Explorer 1 signal was actually made at the Minitrack station at Brown Field, a US Navy airfield near San Diego. This station was later moved to Goldstone, accounting for the error.

Complex tours
The Goldstone Deep Space Communications Complex has temporarily suspended tours for the public. However, there is a Visitor Center located in Harvey House, 681 North First Avenue, Barstow, CA 92311. Operating hours are Monday, Wednesday and Fridays from 9AM - 3PM. There is no entry fee and no need to make reservations to stop by the Visitor Center.

In popular culture 
The 70m dish also known as Mars or DSS14 is featured in the opening sequences of the 1968 film Ice Station Zebra.

The Goldstone Facility was prominently featured in Part 1 of The Incredible Hulk (TV Series) episode, "Prometheus".

A Boy and His Dog (1975 film) used the facility for the industrial looking entrance sequence to the film's world of "Down Under" according to the director's commentary (not without difficulty - the filming crew had a hard time getting access).

See also
 Goldstone Solar System Radar
 List of radio telescopes
 Apollo 11 missing tapes

References

External links

 Goldstone Deep Space Communications Complex Website
 JPL's Deep Space Network Now
 JPL: Images of the Deep Space Network Goldstone, California 
 Historic 'Mars antenna' in Mojave Desert undergoing repairs (Los Angeles Times, October 3, 2010)

Deep Space Network
Space radars
Mojave Desert
Radio telescopes
Astronomical observatories in California
Aerospace museums in California
Museums in San Bernardino County, California
Science museums in California
Buildings and structures in San Bernardino County, California
National Historic Landmarks in California
National Register of Historic Places in San Bernardino County, California
1958 establishments in California